Landsborough County is one of the 141 Cadastral divisions of New South Wales. It is located to the north-west of the Darling River.

Landsborough County was named in honour of the explorer William Landsborough (1825-1886).

Parishes within this county
A full list of parishes found within this county; their current LGA and mapping coordinates to the approximate centre of each location is as follows:

References

Counties of New South Wales